This is a list of Soviet poster artists.

Soviet poster artists 

 Mikhail Baljasnij
 Mikhail Cheremnykh
 Nikolai Chomov
 Viktor Deni
 Nikolai Dolgorukov
 Boris Efimov
 Vladimir Galb
 Iulii Ganf
 Frantisek Gross
 Viktor Semyonovich Ivanov
 Viktor Koretsky
 Gustav Klutsis
 Valentina Kulagina
 Karel Ludwig
 Vladimir Mayakovsky
 Iurii Merkulov
 Dmitry Moor
 Sergei Senkin
 Konstantin Vialov

Groups
 Brigade KGK3 (Viktor Koretsky, Vera Gitsevich, Boris Knoblok)

See also 
 Agitprop
 Photomontage
 Constructivism (art)

Soviet
Poster